The Airflow Twinbee is a Belgian ultralight aircraft, designed and produced by Airflow S.P.R.L., of Brussels and introduced at the Aero show held in Friedrichshafen in 2010. The aircraft is supplied as a kit for amateur construction or as a complete ready-to-fly-aircraft.

Design and development
The aircraft was designed to comply with the Fédération Aéronautique Internationale microlight rules. It features a strut-braced high-wing, a two-seats-in-side-by-side configuration enclosed cockpit, fixed tricycle landing gear and a single engine in tractor configuration.

The aircraft fuselage is made from welded stainless steel tubing covered with a composite skin. The tail boom is a single aluminium tube. The  span wing is made from aluminum sheet and features Junkers-style ailerons. The wings can be folded for ground transportation or storage. Standard engines available are the  Verner 133M and the  Rotax 912UL four-stroke powerplant.

Specifications (Twinbee)

References

External links
Official website archives on Archive.org

2010s Belgian ultralight aircraft
Homebuilt aircraft
Single-engined tractor aircraft